The Professional is the 38th book in Robert B. Parker's  Spenser series and first published in 2009.

Spenser investigates a man who is blackmailing the wives of Boston's wealthiest men.

References

2009 American novels
American detective novels
Spenser (novel series)
Blackmail